Buckmaster is an English surname, and may refer to:

 Adrian Buckmaster, 4th Viscount Buckmaster (born 1949), British businessman
 Charles Buckmaster (1950–1972), Australian poet
 Elliott Buckmaster (1889–1976), American naval officer
 Ernest Buckmaster (1897–1968), Australian artist
 Henrietta Buckmaster (1909–1983), American author
 Jim Buckmaster (born 1962), American CEO of Craigslist
 John C. Buckmaster (1914–1995), English actor, father of Paul Buckmaster
 John D. Buckmaster (b. 1941), American physicist
 John R. Buckmaster (1915–1983), English actor, son of Gladys Cooper
 Martin Stanley Buckmaster, 3rd Viscount Buckmaster (1921–2007), British diplomat
 Maurice Buckmaster (1902–1992), British leader of the French SOE
 Paul Buckmaster (1946–2017), English musician/composer
 Stanley Owen Buckmaster, 1st Viscount Buckmaster (1861–1934), British politician
 Walter Buckmaster (1872–1942), British polo player

See also
 20084 Buckmaster, main-belt asteroid
 Bristol Buckmaster, RAF advanced training aircraft